The 1995 Castilian-Manchegan regional election was held on Sunday, 28 May 1995, to elect the 4th Cortes of the autonomous community of Castilla–La Mancha. All 47 seats in the Cortes were up for election. The election was held simultaneously with regional elections in twelve other autonomous communities and local elections all throughout Spain.

Despite bearing enormous losses, the Spanish Socialist Workers' Party (PSOE) was able to maintain government, albeit with a mere 1-seat majority. The People's Party (PP), which in this election made the greatest gains, finished a close second but remained unable to win the PSOE in one of its — considered — strongest strongholds. Meanwhile, United Left (IU) maintained its presence in the Courts and was able to increase both its vote support and share, but remained unable to gain new seats.

Overview

Electoral system
The Cortes of Castilla–La Mancha were the devolved, unicameral legislature of the autonomous community of Castilla–La Mancha, having legislative power in regional matters as defined by the Spanish Constitution and the Castilian-Manchegan Statute of Autonomy, as well as the ability to vote confidence in or withdraw it from a President of the Junta of Communities. Voting for the Cortes was on the basis of universal suffrage, which comprised all nationals over 18 years of age, registered in Castilla–La Mancha and in full enjoyment of their political rights.

The 47 members of the Cortes of Castilla–La Mancha were elected using the D'Hondt method and a closed list proportional representation, with an electoral threshold of three percent of valid votes—which included blank ballots—being applied in each constituency. Additionally, the use of the D'Hondt method might result in an effective threshold over three percent, depending on the district magnitude. Seats were allocated to constituencies, corresponding to the provinces of Albacete, Ciudad Real, Cuenca, Guadalajara and Toledo. Each constituency was entitled to an initial minimum of five seats, with the remaining 22 allocated among the constituencies in proportion to their populations.

The electoral law provided that parties, federations, coalitions and groupings of electors were allowed to present lists of candidates. However, groupings of electors were required to secure the signature of at least 1 percent of the electors registered in the constituency for which they sought election. Electors were barred from signing for more than one list of candidates. Concurrently, parties and federations intending to enter in coalition to take part jointly at an election were required to inform the relevant Electoral Commission within ten days of the election being called.

Election date
The term of the Cortes of Castilla–La Mancha expired four years after the date of their previous election. Elections to the Cortes were fixed for the fourth Sunday of May every four years. The previous election was held on 26 May 1991, setting the election date for the Cortes on Sunday, 28 May 1995.

The Cortes of Castilla–La Mancha could not be dissolved before the date of expiry of parliament. In the event of an investiture process failing to elect a regional President within a two-month period from the first ballot, the candidate from the party with the highest number of seats was to be deemed automatically elected.

Opinion polls
The table below lists voting intention estimates in reverse chronological order, showing the most recent first and using the dates when the survey fieldwork was done, as opposed to the date of publication. Where the fieldwork dates are unknown, the date of publication is given instead. The highest percentage figure in each polling survey is displayed with its background shaded in the leading party's colour. If a tie ensues, this is applied to the figures with the highest percentages. The "Lead" column on the right shows the percentage-point difference between the parties with the highest percentages in a poll. When available, seat projections determined by the polling organisations are displayed below (or in place of) the percentages in a smaller font; 24 seats were required for an absolute majority in the Cortes of Castilla–La Mancha.

Results

Overall

Distribution by constituency

Aftermath

References
Opinion poll sources

Other

1995 in Castilla–La Mancha
Castilla-La Mancha
Regional elections in Castilla–La Mancha
May 1995 events in Europe